"Queen of Dreams" is a song performed by English band Strawbs and written by Dave Cousins. The track first appeared on the 1972 Grave New World album.

Musical content

The track has a psychedelic quality, due to the first two verses, where acoustic guitar chords were played in reverse order then tape-reversed to provide instrumental backing. The middle section features a solo on a dulcimer played through a fuzzbox, similar to the solo on another Grave New World Track "Benedictus". There follows a short section of special effects which then leads into a third verse, this time with a backing of conventional acoustic guitars. The song continues with a middle 8 section and an instrumental closing section, leading to a drum solo which fades out.

Personnel

Dave Cousins – vocals, acoustic guitar, electric dulcimer
Tony Hooper – backing vocals, acoustic guitar
Blue Weaver – Hammond organ, Mellotron, piano
John Ford – bass guitar
Richard Hudson – drums

External links
 Lyrics to "Queen of Dreams" at Strawbsweb official site

References
Grave New World 30th anniversary article on Strawbsweb
Sleeve notes to album CD 540 934-2 Grave New World (A&M 1998 Remastered)

Strawbs songs
1972 songs
Songs written by Dave Cousins
Songs about dreams